"E Kale the One" is 2013 single and music video with music composed by Dinesh Subasinghe. The video was directed by Ranushka Fernando, lyrics written by Christina Fernando, and it featured vocalist Charmika Sirimanne. The music video has reached 1.4 million views on 'YouTube'.

Background and musical style 
"E Kale the One" is the first official music video released by composer Dinesh Subasinghe since returning from the KM Music Conservatory in Chennai, and his second alternative rock music video. The music combines traditional rock instruments, such as the electric guitar, with the classical violin played by Subasinghe. It is sung by Sri Lankan vocalists Charmika Sirimanne and Trishala Wijethunga. The lyrics are by Christina Fernando.

Cast and crew 

The cast includes Sri Lanka artists Dananjaya Siriwardhana, Vishwa Kodikara, Rajitha Chamikara (Ping Pong), Suresh Gamage, Niroshan Wijesinghe, Shashe Angeleena, and vocalists Trishala Wijethunga and Charmika Sirimanne. The composer, Dinesh Subasinghe is also one of the actors in the video. The video was directed by Ranushka Fernando.

References

External links 
 "E Kale" on IMDb

2013 singles
Sri Lankan music